The following are the baseball events of the years 1845 to 1868 throughout the world.

Events
1837 – The Gotham Club of New York is formed.
1845 Summer – The Knickerbocker Base Ball Club is formed by breakaway members of the New York or "Gotham" Club, headed by Duncan Curry, Alexander Cartwright and William R. Wheaton.
1845 September 10 – A baseball game is played that is described the following day in the New York Morning News, the earliest known game write-up.
1845 September 23 – The New York Knickerbockers draw up the earliest surviving set of baseball rules, the Knickerbocker Rules, which are written down by William R. Wheaton and William H. Tucker.
1845 October 11 – A club from Brooklyn defeats one from New York (i.e. Manhattan) at the Union Star Cricket Ground in Brooklyn, the home team winning 22–1.  The game is reported in the New York Morning News and True Sun newspapers.
1845 October 21 – A second baseball game is played between the New York and Brooklyn clubs at the Elysian Fields, Hoboken, New Jersey, with New York prevailing 24–4, and the first known box score appears in the New York Morning News the following day.
1845 October 25 – The rubber game is played between New York and Brooklyn at the Union Star Cricket Ground, New York taking the game and the series by a score of 34–19.
1846 June 19 – The New York Knickerbockers play the "New York nine" at Elysian Fields, Hoboken, New Jersey. The Knickerbockers lose to the New Yorks by a score of 23–1 in four innings of play.
1850 April – The Eagle Club is formed. The Gotham Club is organized.
1852 – The Eagle Club publishes its rules.
1854 – The Knickerbocker, Gotham and Eagle clubs agree on a unified set of rules. The pitching distance is defined for the first time, as "not less than 15 paces."
1854 October 12 – The Empire club is formed in Manhattan but plays in Hoboken.
1854 December 8 – The Excelsior club established in South Brooklyn. 
1855 – The Atlantic Club of Brooklyn is organized in Jamaica, Long Island.
1855 May 1 The Newark Club established in New Jersey.
1855 May – The Putnam Club established in Williamsburgh, Brooklyn.
1855 June 4 – The Baltic Club of New York formed.
1855 June 27 The Eckford club established in Greenpoint, Brooklyn.
1855 July 17 – The Union Club founded in Morrisania (now in the Bronx).
1855 October – The Continental Club organized in Williamsburgh, Brooklyn.
1856 March – The Harlem Club established.
1856 June 28 – The Enterprise club founded in Bedford.
1856 August 14 – The Atlantic of New York club established in Bedford. 
1856 October – The Star club organized in South Brooklyn.
1857 – The Mutual Club is founded in Manhattan and the Adriatic Club in Newark, NJ.
1857 January – The Independent club founded in New York.
1857 January 22 and February 25 – The National Association of Base Ball Players (NABBP) is formed in meetings of sixteen New York area baseball clubs, and promulgates revised rules including nine-inning games, nine-man teams and 90 feet between the bases.
1857 March – The Liberty club established in New Brunswick.
1857 March 4 – The Metropolitan club organized in New York.
1857 March 14 – The Champion club organized in New York.
1857 March 23 – The Hamilton club established in Brooklyn.
1857 April 28 – The St. Nicholas club organized in Hoboken.
1858 – The first all-star games, and the first baseball games to charge admission, took place in Corona, Queens, New York, at the Fashion Race Course.  The called strike is introduced.
1859 – The Potomac Club is formed in the summer and the National club in November in Washington, D.C.
1859 July 1 – Amherst College defeats Williams College 73–32 in a game played in Pittsfield, Massachusetts.
1860 – Athletic of Philadelphia is formed. The Olympic Ball Club of Philadelphia changes from "Philadelphia rules" town ball to New York (NABBP) rules. The Eureka Club of Newark starts playing other teams in the NABBP.  The Union Club of Lansingburgh team is formed, which would later become the Haymaker Club of Troy in the NABBP. The first baseball almanac, Beadle's Dime Base-Ball Player edited by Henry Chadwick, begins publication.

1860 February 22 – First recorded baseball game played in San Francisco, California between the San Francisco Eagles and the San Francisco Red Rovers.
1860 September 28 – The first baseball game reported between two named black teams. At Elysian Fields in Hoboken, New Jersey, the Weeksville of New York beat the Colored Union Club 11–0.
1862 April – The Summit City Club is formed in Fort Wayne, Indiana (the club would reform as the Kekionga in 1866).
1864 – The called ball and base-on-balls are introduced.
1865 – The "fly rule" introduced: fair balls caught on the first bounce are no longer outs.
1865 August 30 – President Andrew Johnson welcomes the Atlantic and National clubs to the White House in the first documented case of the long-standing tradition of inviting successful sports teams to meet with the President.
1865 October – The Cream City Club of Milwaukee team is formed.
1866 – The Kekionga club is reformed in Fort Wayne after the end of the Civil War.
1866–1868 – The Forest City Club of Rockford, Illinois features future superstars Albert Spalding and Ross Barnes.
1866 June 23 – The Resolute Base Ball Club of Cincinnati, the future Red Stockings, is formed and plays four outside matches.
1867 – The Cincinnati Base Ball Club plays in the NABBP.

Champions

National Association of Base Ball Players:
1857: Atlantic of Brooklyn
1858: Mutual of New York
1859: Atlantic of Brooklyn
1860: Atlantic of Brooklyn
1861: Atlantic of Brooklyn
1862: Eckford of Brooklyn
1863: Eckford of Brooklyn
1864: Atlantic of Brooklyn
1865: Atlantic of Brooklyn
1866: Atlantic of Brooklyn
1867: Union of Morrisania
1868: Mutual of New York

Season records
At its December 1868 annual meeting, the National Association of Base Ball Players (NABBP) permitted professional clubs. Twelve existing members did "go pro" and constitute the professional field for 1869.

1868 records of major clubs
Marshall Wright publishes 1868 season records for 98 teams, many of them incomplete ("(inc)" in the table). Bill Ryczek calls 15 of that season's teams "major" (not marked). This table covers all of those "majors" (not marked), all of the 1869 "pros" (*), all 14 member clubs with at least twelve wins on record, and a few others. For the seven listed clubs in Greater New York, no city is named in the first column; the comment gives their locales.

At least four Association clubs not listed here would someday try professionalism: Riverside of Portsmouth, Ohio (1870); Kekionga of Fort Wayne, Indiana (1871); Middletown of Mansfield, Connecticut (1872); Resolute of Elizabeth, New Jersey (1873).

Meanwhile, only two brand new professional baseball clubs would be established in the next three years, the Chicago White Stockings for 1870 and the Boston Red Stockings for 1871. Their commercial origins may be related to their survival alone by 1877, and on to 2010, while all of their rivals with older and amateur roots fell away.

1867 records of major clubs
Marshall Wright publishes 1867 season records for 89 teams, many of them incomplete ("(inc)" in the table). Bill Ryczek calls 17 of that season's teams "major" (not marked). This table covers all of those "majors", all 13 member clubs with at least fourteen wins on record, and a few others. For the nine listed clubs in Greater New York, no city is named in the first column; the comment gives their locales.

Star (*) marks ten clubs among twelve who would go pro in 1869. Excelsior of Chicago and Buckeye of Cincinnati are listed because they were probably the strongest teams in the west after the Cincinnati Red Stockings.

1866 records of major clubs
Marshall Wright publishes 1866 season records for 58 of 93 association members, said to be complete for games between two member clubs. Bill Ryczek calls 20 of that season's teams "major" including three old New York rivals of the Knickerbockers.

This table covers all of those "majors", all 14 members with at least eight wins on record, and a few others. For the fifteen listed clubs in Greater New York, no city is named in the first column; the comment gives their locales.

Star (*) marks eight clubs among twelve who would go pro in 1869, three seasons later.

1865 and earlier clubs
For the preceding 1865 season Marshall Wright lists 30 members with supposedly complete records for most of them. Twenty-two of the thirty were in Greater New York. Bill Ryczek calls 19 teams "major" in the first season that he covers: sixteen of the members and three others (Lowell, Harvard, and Camden).

No one traveled much and membership was still depressed by the Civil War. There had been 59 delegates at the March 1860 annual meeting, and 55 at the next annual meeting that December (on a new baseball calendar), who thereby intended to play during the 1861 season that the war curtailed. Nine of 59 and eleven of 55 were from outside Greater New York.

Births

1840s
1847
January 28 – George Wright
December 7 – Deacon White
1848
October [?] – Wally Goldsmith
October 18 – Candy Cummings
1849
April 1 – John McMullin

1850s
1850
Date of birth missing
Bill Allison
Robert Armstrong
Ned Connor
Dickie Flowers
Tom Miller
William Rexter
January [?] – John Glenn
February 7 – Mike Hooper
March 26 – Morrie Critchley
April [?] – Wallace Terry
April 8 – John Peters
April 12 – Sandy Nava
May 8 – Ross Barnes
June 12 – John Stedronsky
June 13 – Bobby Clack
July 13 – Tom York
July 14 – Jim Holdsworth
June 23 – George Bird
July 24 – Joe Miller
July 26 – Tricky Nichols
August [?] – Tommy Beals
August 1 – Michael Campbell
August 10 – Jim Clinton
August 23 – Fred Andrus
August 31 – Gene Kimball
September 1 – Jim O'Rourke
September 2 – Albert Spalding
October 3 – Al Nevin
October 29 – George Ewell
November 22 – Favel Wordsworth
November 23 – Cy Bentley
November 30 – Alamazoo Jennings
December 25 – Fraley Rogers
1851
September 11- Mike Golden
October [?] – Orator Shafer
1852
February 5 – Charlie Hautz
March 27 – Ed Cushman
April 17 – Cap Anson
April 30 – Charley Jones
August 22 – Martin Mullen
December 10 – Frank Bliss
1853
1854
September 8 – Russ McKelvy
November 4 – John Abadie
December 11 – Charles Radbourn
1855
March 21 – William Coon
October 2 – Jack Allen
October 2 – John Carbine
1856
October 1 – John E. Bruce
December 25 – Pud Galvin
1857
January 1 – Tim Keefe
July 1 – Roger Connor
August 20 – George Baker
August 22 – Ned Hanlon
October 7 – Moxie Hengel
October 19 - Tom Poorman
December 31 – King Kelly
1858
Date of birth missing
January 1 – John Doyle
May 8 – Dan Brouthers
May 25 – Tip O'Neill
August 19 – Phil Coridan
September 11 – Mike DePangher
October 15 – J. R. Malone
1859
January 30 – Tony Mullane, Irish-American baseball player and manager (d. 1944)
July [?] – Tony Murphy
July 4 – Mickey Welch
July 8 – Hank O'Day
August 15 – Charles Comiskey
September 29 – Dave Orr
October 17 – Buck Ewing
October 26 – Frank Selee
November 1 – Bid McPhee

1860–1868
1860
June 26 – Al Strueve
August 27 – Scrappy Carroll
August 29 – Buck West
1861
August 28 – Charlie Reising
1862
March 3 – Jumbo Schoeneck
July 14 – Law Daniels
December 22 – Connie Mack
1863
May 25 – John Hofford
July 16 – John B. Foster
October 25 – Bill Shettsline
1864
April 17 – Jersey Bakley
June [?] – John Cuff
August 7 – Adonis Terry
October 25 - John Godar
1865
January 6 - Sun Daly
May 4 – Chuck Lauer
May [?] – Fred Smith
June 30 – Tim Hurst
July 19 – Jim Donnelly
1866
January 5 – William B. Hanna
March 12 – Denny Lyons
March 25 – Larry McKeon
April 20 – Pat Hannivan
August 26 – Ledell Titcomb
September 4 – Elmer Horton
September 16 – Joe Vila
November 28 – Sy Sanborn
1867
March 29 – Cy Young
August 5 – Jacob Ruppert
October 7 – Brickyard Kennedy
1868
Date of birth missing
Jim Adams
Frank Knauss
Sparrow McCaffrey
Ambrose McGann
Ed Pabst
Jim Powers
Kid Summers
Fred Truax
January [?] – Tom Letcher
January 1 – Dave Zearfoss
January 9 – Harley Payne
January 11 – Silver King
January 12 – Dan Daub
January 14 – John Newell
January 15 – Jock Menefee
January 28 – Dan Sweeney
January 30 – General Stafford
February 13 – Biff Sheehan
February 19 – Sal Campfield
February 22 – George Davies
February 23 – Lew Camp
March 10 – Lew Whistler
March 10 – Theodore Conover
March 13 – Bill Gilbert
March 15 – Roscoe Coughlin
March 19 – Skyrocket Smith
March 23 – Mike Smith
March 25 – Frank Dwyer
March 31 – Jack Stivetts
April [?] – Warren Fitzgerald
April 2 – Frank Boyd
April 6 – Walt Preston
April 10 – Tom Parrott
April 25 – Fred Hartman
May [?] – Will Calihan
May 1 – Pete Allen
May 9 – Josh Reilly
May 10 – Ed Barrow
May 17 – Fred Woodcock
May 28 – John Bates
June [?] – George Hodson
June [?] – Ed Knouff
June [?] – Bob Miller
June 7 – Mike Ryan
June 12 – Sol White
June 27 – Bill Daley
June 28 – John Taber
July 5 – Pat Wright
July 7 – Willard Mains
July 8 – Harry H. Gilbert
July 18 – Tony Madigan
July 24 – Billy Graulich
July 29 – George Rettger
August 11 – Dan O'Connor
August 12 – Charlie Bell
August 12 – Jerry Harrington
August 31 – Red Ehret
September [?] – Jeremiah Reardon
September 1 – Mike O'Rourke
September 2 – Al Sauter
September 10 – Dusty Miller
September 11 – Steve Brodie
September 15 – Frank O'Connor
September 21 – Joe Daly
October [?] – Bobby Cargo
October [?] – Tom Cahill
October 6 – Whitey Gibson
October 10 – Dave Anderson
October 10 – Ad Gumbert
October 14 – Fred Underwood
October 18 – Boileryard Clarke
October 22 – Charlie Weber
October 25 – Dan Burke
November 2 – Jim McCormick
November 5 – Charlie Newman
November 7 – Julie Freeman
November 9 – Bill Phillips
November 12 – Bill Gleason
November 12 – Jack Ryan
November 17 – Ezra Lincoln
December [?] – Bill Sullivan
December 1 – George Fox
December 4 – Jesse Burkett
December 5 – Frank Bowerman
December 8 – Jocko Halligan
December 10 – Neil Stynes
December 11 – Tom Gettinger
December 13 – Bill Everitt
December 15 – George Hemming

Deaths

1860s

1862
October 18 – Jim Creighton

References

Orem, Preston D. (1961). Baseball (1845–1881) From the Newspaper Accounts. Altadena, California: Self-published.
Ryczek, William J. (1998). When Johnny Came Sliding Home: The Post-Civil War Baseball Boom, 1865–1870. Jefferson, North Carolina: McFarland & Co. .
 Wright, Marshall D. (2000). The National Association of Base Ball Players, 1857–1870. Jefferson, North Carolina: McFarland & Co. .

External links
 Baseball History: 19th Century Baseball

History of baseball
1840s in sports
1850s in sports
1860s in sports
Baseball by year
1840s in North American sport
1850s in North American sport
1860s in North American sport